Reed Garrett (born January 2, 1993) is an American professional baseball pitcher in the Baltimore Orioles organization. He has previously played in Major League Baseball (MLB) for the Detroit Tigers and Washington Nationals and in Nippon Professional Baseball (NPB) for the Saitama Seibu Lions.

Career

Texas Rangers
Garrett attended Mills E. Godwin High School in Richmond, Virginia. He attended the Virginia Military Institute and played college baseball for the Keydets from 2012 through 2014. He was drafted by the Texas Rangers in the 16th round, 486th overall, of the 2014 MLB Draft.

Garrett spent his professional debut season of 2014 with the Spokane Indians of the Class A Short Season Northwest League, posting a 6–1 record with a 4.06 ERA and 46 strikeouts in 57.2 innings over 16 games (9 starts). Garrett split the 2015 season between the Hickory Crawdads of the Class A South Atlantic League and the High Desert Mavericks of the Class A-Advanced California League, combining to go 10–8 with a 4.58 ERA, 96 strikeouts, and 139.2 innings pitched over 25 games (25 starts). He split the 2016 season between High Desert, the Frisco RoughRiders of the Double-A Texas League, and the Round Rock Express of the Triple-A Pacific Coast League. He recorded a combined 4–9 record with a 6.24 ERA, 86 strikeouts, and 109.2 innings pitched over 29 games (18 starts). After the 2016 regular season, Garrett played for the Surprise Saguaros of the Arizona Fall League. He recorded a 2.25 ERA in 16 innings pitched.

He spent 2017 season with Frisco, posting a 2–5 record with a 4.98 ERA, 70 strikeouts, and 68.2 innings pitched in 44 games (4 starts). In 2018, Garrett became a full time relief pitcher and split the season between Frisco and the Round Rock Express of the Triple-A Pacific Coast League, posting a combined 4–2 record with a 2.04 ERA, 61 strikeouts, and 61.2 innings pitched over 51 games.  Following the 2018 regular season, Garrett pitched for the Naranjeros de Hermosillo of the Mexican Pacific League in winter ball, appearing in four games and recording a 9.82 ERA in 3.2 innings pitched.

Detroit Tigers
Garrett was selected by the Detroit Tigers with the 5th pick in the 2018 Rule 5 draft. On March 27, 2019, the Tigers announced that Garrett had made the 2019 opening day roster. He made his major league debut on March 29 versus the Toronto Blue Jays, recording one strikeout over one inning of relief. He was designated for assignment on May 16 after going 0–0 with a 8.22 ERA over 15 innings.

Second stint with Texas
On May 20, 2019, Garrett was returned to the Texas Rangers organization. He was then assigned to the Nashville Sounds of the Triple-A Pacific Coast League for the remainder of the season, going 1–3 with a 4.91 ERA in 40 innings.

Saitama Seibu Lions
On December 24, 2019, Garrett signed with the Saitama Seibu Lions of Nippon Professional Baseball.

On June 19, 2020, Garrett made his NPB debut. On December 2, 2020, he become a free agent.

On December 29, 2020, Garrett re-signed with the Lions for the 2021 season. He became a free agent following the 2021 season.

Washington Nationals
On February 23, 2022, Garrett signed a minor league contract with the Washington Nationals. He was assigned to the Triple-A Rochester Red Wings to begin the year.

On June 14, 2022, Garrett was selected to the 40-man roster and added to the active roster. In 7 appearances, Garrett logged a 6.75 ERA with 6 strikeouts in 9.1 innings pitched.

He was designated for assignment following the season on December 22, 2022. On January 5, 2023, Garrett was sent outright to Triple-A, but he rejected the outright assignment and elected free agency the following day.

Baltimore Orioles
On January 19, 2023, Garrett signed a minor league contract with the Baltimore Orioles.

See also
Rule 5 draft results

References

External links

VMI Keydets bio

1993 births
Living people
American expatriate baseball players in Japan
American expatriate baseball players in Mexico
Baseball players from Virginia
Detroit Tigers players
Frisco RoughRiders players
Hickory Crawdads players
High Desert Mavericks players
Naranjeros de Hermosillo players
Nashville Sounds players
Nippon Professional Baseball pitchers
Major League Baseball pitchers
People from Henrico County, Virginia
Round Rock Express players
Saitama Seibu Lions players
Spokane Indians players
Surprise Saguaros players
VMI Keydets baseball players
Washington Nationals players